Souk El Kachachine is one of the souks of the medina of Tunis. It is specialized in selling second-hand clothes.

Location 
It is located in the east of Al-Zaytuna Mosque, near souk El Nissa.

History 
The souk was founded during the Hafsid era between 1128 and 1535.

Monuments 

Hammam El Kachachine is located in this souk.

Notes and references 

Kachachine